Apple Writer is a word processor for the Apple II family of personal computers.  It was created by Paul Lutus and published in 1979 by Apple Computer.

History

Apple Writer 1.0
Paul Lutus wrote Apple Writer alone in a small cottage he built himself atop a hill in the woods of Oregon, connected to the electricity grid via  of cable strung in trees. The original 1979 version of Apple Writer ran from a 13-sector DOS 3.2 diskette and supported 40-column text display.  It displayed text entirely in uppercase, but case could be toggled by pressing the ESC key; characters that the user signified as uppercase appeared in inverse (black-on-white) capitals, while characters in lowercase appeared as standard capitals.  The names of the binary files Apple Writer 1.0 produced began with the prefix "TEXT".

An undocumented feature was its ability to print to printers using a game paddle port as a serial interface. Users had to build their own serial cables; the risk of damage to the computer or printer was why Apple did not publicize the information, but Lutus documented the feature in a letter to BYTE.

Apple Writer 1.1
Released in 1980, Apple Writer 1.1 took advantage of DOS 3.3 and ran under the newer 16-sector format. It also featured a spell checker known as Goodspell and some minor bug fixes.

Apple Writer II
Apple Writer II was released in 1981 and, like its predecessor, ran under DOS 3.3 on an Apple II Plus.  Unlike the original, Apple Writer II could display both upper and lower case characters and, with a Sup'R'Terminal card in slot 3, could support both 40- and 80-column text.  It also wrapped text too long to appear on the current line (rather than breaking it mid-word) and included a glossary and the Word Processing Language (WPL), a macro-like resource that allowed certain tasks to be automated.  Apple Writer II files saved as standard text files rather than the older binary files.

Apple Writer ///
This program was released in 1982 for the Apple ///, and was able to use the enhanced capabilities of the Apple ///.

Apple Writer IIe
Released in 1983, Apple Writer IIe took advantage of the Apple IIe's built-in 80-column display and full keyboard and featured the ability to create larger files, print files to disk and directly connect the computer keyboard to a printer for typewriter-like operation.

Apple Writer 2.0
Apple Writer 2.0 was released in September 1984 and was the first version of the series to run under ProDOS. It allowed users to set screen margins and to connect the computer's keyboard to a modem, allowing it to be used as a rudimentary terminal program.

Apple Writer 2.1
Published in late 1985, this version corrected a problem with parallel printer cards present in 2.0 and changed printed characters from low-ASCII to high-ASCII, correcting an issue with certain interface cards and printers.

Freeware
Following the success of AppleWorks, Apple discontinued the Apple Writer series.  Creator Paul Lutus agreed in 1992 to make his program available on a freeware basis: it could be copied freely and given away, but could not be sold for a profit.

Interface
Apple Writer used inline commands, so formatting did not appear on-screen; it would appear when the document was printed. Paragraph formatting was specified with dot-commands, each of which required its own line. For example:

 .ff     form feed (new page)
 .lmXX   set left margin to XX characters
 .rmYY   set right margin to YY characters
 .cj     center justification
 .fj     full justification
Character formatting was specified with escape-commands, which varied depending on the printer. Common commands included Esc-X to begin underlining, and Esc-Y to end underlining.

Reception
Compute!s reviewer wrote in 1980 "I have looked at other text editors for the Apple, some of which were overloaded with features. Given the hardware limitations of the Apple II, I feel that Apple Writer is a very useful document creation tool", and stated that he wrote the review with Apple Writer. II Computing listed it third on the magazine's list of top Apple II software as of late 1985, based on sales and market-share data.

References

External links
 Apple II History, Chapter 18: Apple Writer
 Apple Writer 1.0 Software

1979 software
Apple II word processors